The Campaign to Suppress Bandits in Central and Southern China (中南剿匪) was a counter-guerrilla / counterinsurgency campaign the communists fought against the Nationalist guerrillas that mostly consisted of anti-Communist irregular forces and Nationalist regular troops left behind after the Nationalist government withdrew from mainland China.  The campaign was fought during the Chinese Civil War in the post-World War II era in six Chinese provinces: Henan, Hubei, Hunan, Jiangxi, Guangdong and Guangxi, and resulted in a Communist victory.

Strategies

Nationalist strategies
Like other attempts by the Nationalists to wage guerrilla and insurgency warfare against the Communists after being driven from power in China, its strategic miscalculations contributed as much, if not more, to their eventual defeat than their opponents' military and political victories.

At the close of World War II, the Nationalist government--weakened by years of war with both the Japanese and Communist guerrillas--came to an agreement with surrendering Japanese forces. The agreement was that the Japanese would not surrender to Communist authorities but to Nationalist generals and, since the Nationalists did not have sufficient troops to garrison the territory formerly occupied by the Japanese--nor the means to get them there even if they had enough--they allowed the Japanese to keep their weapons and, in fact, "police" the areas they formerly occupied, to keep them from falling into the hands of the Communists. This resulted in further alienation from and resentment against the Nationalist government by the local population, which had already blamed the Nationalists for losing large chunks of the country to the Japanese invaders during the war. Half a decade later, when the Nationalists were driven from mainland China, they made the same miscalculation: they enlisted the help of local "guerrilla" fighters--who were mostly bandit gangs--to fight the Communists, and ordered surviving Nationalist troops to join these units. However, the bandits were feared and hated by the local populace they had robbed and terrorized for so long, and the sight of Nationalist troops fighting with these forces instead of against them did not help to win the "hearts and minds" of the general population. In fact, it achieved exactly the opposite effect, strengthening popular support for their Communist enemy.  

The second strategic miscalculation made by the Nationalist government was also similar to the one it made immediately after World War II when it attempted to simultaneously solve (a) the warlord problem that had plagued China for so long and (b) the problem of exterminating Communists. The warlords allied with Chiang Kai-shek's Nationalist government were interested solely in keeping the power, riches and influence they had, and when the invading Japanese offered to let them keep their power and privilege in exchange for their collaboration, they immediately defected to the Japanese.  After World War II, these warlords returned to the Nationalist camp for the same reason they defected to the Japanese. Chiang was caught in a bind--as much as he wanted to pay back these warlord generals who had once betrayed him, to do so would have alienated other factions within the Nationalist ranks. Also, these men did have considerable military power, and could still help the Nationalists by holding on to territory that Chiang's government was unable to, and fighting off the Communists. Chiang's idea was that both his warlord and Communist enemies would be weakened by fighting each other.  In addition, Chiang knew that the warlord forces the Nationalist governments had failed to eradicate were not prime candidates for evacuation to Taiwan half a decade later, and using them to fight the Communists appeared to be the only logical alternative.  If the Communists were greatly weakened by fighting the bandits, it would make it easier for the Nationalists to retake China.  If the bandit gangs were defeated, it would make it easier for the Nationalists to eliminate them after they had retaken China. However, just like those warlords, the bandits were also only interested in keeping their own power, and did not put any real effort in fighting the Communists in the way that some of the Nationalists who were still fighting for their "cause".  The eradication of bandits by the Communist government only served to strengthen support for them among the people, since no previous governments, dating back to the Qing Dynasty, had been able to do so.
 [
{
  "type": "ExternalData",
  "service": "geoshape",
  "ids": "Q43684,Q46862,Q45761,Q57052,Q15175,Q15176",
"properties": 
       { "fill": "#000080",  
       "fill-opacity": 0.4,
       } 

}
] 
The third strategic miscalculation made by the retreating Nationalist government was similar to the second one, but this concerned its own troops which had been left behind. The Nationalist government faced a dilemma: its best, most highly trained and disciplined troops were desperately needed to defend Taiwan, the last Nationalist sanctuary. Its less disciplined, motivated and experienced troops were definitely not suited for that particular task, and were not given top priority for evacuation.  Instead, they were left behind to fight the Communists behind enemy lines. What this did, however, was to alienate and demoralize those very troops, and it was impossible to expect them to fight their Communist enemy with the same motivation and fervor that the more dedicated Nationalist troops did. Compounding the problem was the fact that the bandit gangs these troops were to work with, because of their knowledge of the local terrain and populace, were often rewarded with higher ranks and more pay than the regular Nationalist troops received. As a result, the Nationalist troops--who were now "guerrilla fighters"--lacked the willingness to work together with the bandits they once hunted down, especially when many of these same bandit gangs had killed their fellow soldiers during previous eradication / pacification campaigns. Many loyal Nationalists were enraged by the fact that they now had to take orders from the very bandit leaders they had once fought. For their part, the bandit leaders felt similarly about their former enemies, and often used these troops in particularly dangerous missions in order to minimize casualties to their own men.

The fourth strategic miscalculation made by the retreating nationalist government was financial and economical. These bandits-turned-guerrillas were mostly provided with arms, but due to the Nationalist government's dire financial straits were not given sufficient supplies and money. The bandits-turned-guerrillas went back to their old habits--robbing and looting the population in their local area. This inevitably drove the people to look to the Communists for protection from the very people who were supposed to be "protecting" them. The trickle of financial support provided by the Nationalist government was simply not enough to support such guerrilla and insurgency warfare on a large scale.

Another unexpected but disastrous result of the insufficient financial support was that worked to erode support for the Nationalist government within its own ranks. Wealthy landowners and businessmen were strong supporters of the Nationalist government. Since it was often their properties and businesses that were being confiscated by the Communists and redistributed to the poor, their hatred of the Communist government was enough to cause many of them to stay behind voluntarily to fight behind enemy lines. However, the landowners and businessmen had also long suffered attacks and depredations by the bandits as well as the Communists. Now that they were ordered to fight under the same men who had once robbed, lotted, kidnapped and at times murdered their friends and relatives, what cooperation they extended to their former enemies was in name only. This policy only served to alienate, dispirit and demoralize these formerly ardent supporters of the Nationalist movement.

Another problem for the Nationalists was the strong disagreement among their own leadership on the best ways to continue this war against the Communist enemy. Military leaders advocated a total war, but this conflicted with the interests of another strong faction of the Nationalist government: landowners and businessmen who had joined the bandits to fight the Communists. They had done so because they believed that the Nationalists would be able to retake mainland China within a few years, after which they would be able to regain their lost lands, businesses and other properties that had been confiscated and redistributed to the poor by the Communists.  If the "total war" tactics advocated by the military leaders would be carried out by the Nationalist guerrillas now working with the bandits on the mainland, the businesses and factories owned by these businessmen would be damaged or destroyed. If the Nationalists did manage to retake China, these properties would require millions of dollars to be rebuilt. In addition, the bandit leaders themselves opposed the "total war" tactic, for their own reasons: if these assets were damaged or destroyed, then there would be little for them to rob and loot. As a result, mutual self-interest trumped mutual animosities--these former enemies were united in their opposition to the military's "total war" policy.

Communist Party strategy
In comparison to the Nationalists, the Communist goal was much simpler and more focused: exterminate all bandits, which was much easier to achieve than the conflicting strategic goal of the Nationalists. The Communists also enjoyed another advantage: their command structure was unified so that they could fight much more effectively compared to their Nationalist adversary, which was unified in name only but fought independently, despite their impressive numbers: the Nationalist army totaled more than 1,160,000 men.  Communists were also much better armed than their opponents due to the Nationalists' rapid retreat from the mainland, which left their government with not enough time to train and equip the guerrillas left behind/ As a result, roughly half of the guerrillas were armed with modern weaponry.  Communists mobilized 63 divisions totaling over 41,000 troops and an additional 60,000 militia in the Central and Southern China Military Region to fight local bandits in the regions including western Henan, western Hubei, southern Jiangxi, northeastern Jiangxi, western Hunan, southern Hunan, western Guangdong, northern Guangdong, Pearl River Delta, western Guangxi, southeastern Guangxi and the border region between Hubei, Anhui and Henan.  The campaign in central and southern China actually consisted of several smaller campaigns including Campaign to Suppress Bandits in Dabieshan, Campaign to Suppress Bandits in Guangxi, Campaign to Suppress Bandits in Western Hunan and Campaign to Suppress Bandits in the Border Region of Hunan-Hubei-Sichuan.

Campaign
The Communists planned their campaign in three stages, with the first lasting from May to November 1949. Henan, Hubei, Hunan, Jiangxi, Guangxi and Guangdong Military Districts mobilized available regular and militia forces and launched waves of offensives against bandits; by the end of the year, over 334,600 bandits had been annihilated.  After a brief and dormant period, however, the bandits/guerrillas counterattacked in the spring of 1950. The Communist high command of the Central and Southern Military Region held a conference in March 1950 to discuss the next step and decided it would take three months to eradicate the bandits. Over 40,000 troops were allotted to the Hunan Military District to eradicate bandits in western Hunan, Taifu (太浮) Mountains in Changde and Dragon Mountain in Shaoyang, and by the end of June 1950 over 40,000 bandits had been killed. An equal number were killed in the same period in Pearl River Delta and on the coastal islands in Guangdong. Meanwhile, eight regiments of Guangxi Military District managed to kill over 30,000 bandits in southeastern Guangxi.

In July 1950 the bandits/guerrillas became overly confident due to the outbreak of the Korean War, believing that the Communist regime would collapse because it was not a match for the much more powerful US military. Consequently, they decided to launch a massive offensive. The Communist high command of Central and Southern Military Region held a second conference and decided to reinforce Guangxi and Guangdong, concentrating on western and northern Guangdong. In western Hunan two commands in the north and south would be formed to better coordinate the campaigns aimed at eradicating bandits in the border region of Hubei, Sichuan, Guizhou and Guangxi provinces.  By the end of May 1951 over 500,000 bandits had been eradicated. This marked the end of conventional warfare, which the bandits/guerrillas could no longer launch and they also could no longer mass sufficient strength to launch any strikes that posed a real threat to the communist regime.  By the beginning of June 1950 the campaign turned into purely counter-guerrilla warfare.  The Communists improved upon their military success by sending over 30,000 cadres to the countryside to support land reform, and managed to win the support of most of the peasantry there. The Communists further changed their tactics by forming over 3,000 counter-guerrilla teams and fought the bandits/guerrillas with guerrilla warfare, and after a year over 76,000 bandits were further eradicated.

On June 1, 1952, the Communists adjusted their tactics once more due to the progress made earlier, and the concentration turned into counterinsurgency warfare, with the responsibility transferred to local police forces.  However, the Chinese police force at the time, the Public Security Army (Gong An Jun, 公安军) was a branch of the regular army. By April 1953 another 17,000 bandits were eradicated, and in June 1953 all tasks were transferred to police forces when the Communists declared that the campaign ended with the eradication of over 1.16 million bandits in central and southern China.

Outcome
Although sharing the common anti-communist goal, the nationalist guerrilla and insurgency warfare was largely handicapped by the enlistment of bandits, many of whom had fought and killed nationalist troops earlier in the eradication / pacification campaign, and compounded by the additional differences within the nationalist guerrilla, the nationalist guerrilla and insurgency warfare against its communist enemy failed.  For the communists, in addition to the complete eradication of the bandits, another benefit of the campaign was obtaining a valuable source of tough soldiers: most bandits were captured and surrendered with a significant portion of them later joined People's Volunteer Army to fight in the Korean War, and facing the overwhelming superior firepower of UN, their performance was considered “heroic” and “brave” by the communists. However, due to obvious political reasons, their banditry past was carefully left out in the communist propaganda and it was not until in the late 1990s was the truth finally allowed to be publicized.

See also
List of Battles of Chinese Civil War
National Revolutionary Army
History of the People's Liberation Army
Chinese Civil War

References

Zhu, Zongzhen and Wang, Chaoguang, Liberation War History, 1st Edition, Social Scientific Literary Publishing House in Beijing, 2000,  (set)
Zhang, Ping, History of the Liberation War, 1st Edition, Chinese Youth Publishing House in Beijing, 1987,  (pbk.)
Jie, Lifu, Records of the Liberation War: The Decisive Battle of Two Kinds of Fates, 1st Edition, Hebei People's Publishing House in Shijiazhuang, 1990,  (set)
Literary and Historical Research Committee of the Anhui Committee of the Chinese People's Political Consultative Conference, Liberation War, 1st Edition, Anhui People's Publishing House in Hefei, 1987, 
Li, Zuomin, Heroic Division and Iron Horse: Records of the Liberation War, 1st Edition, Chinese Communist Party History Publishing House in Beijing, 2004, 
Wang, Xingsheng, and Zhang, Jingshan, Chinese Liberation War, 1st Edition, People's Liberation Army Literature and Art Publishing House in Beijing, 2001,  (set)
Huang, Youlan, History of the Chinese People's Liberation War, 1st Edition, Archives Publishing House in Beijing, 1992, 
Liu Wusheng, From Yan'an to Beijing: A Collection of Military Records and Research Publications of Important Campaigns in the Liberation War, 1st Edition, Central Literary Publishing House in Beijing, 1993, 
Tang, Yilu and Bi, Jianzhong, History of Chinese People's Liberation Army in Chinese Liberation War, 1st Edition, Military Scientific Publishing House in Beijing, 1993 – 1997,  (Volume 1), 7800219615 (Volume 2), 7800219631 (Volum 3), 7801370937 (Volum 4), and 7801370953 (Volum 5)

Conflicts in 1949
Conflicts in 1950
Conflicts in 1951
Conflicts in 1952
Conflicts in 1953
Battles of the Chinese Civil War
Military history of Shandong
1949 in China
1950 in China
1951 in China
1952 in China
1953 in China
Campaigns to Suppress Bandits